Katablepharis (alternative spelling Kathablepharis) is a genus of single-celled eukaryotes comprising five to six species. They are heterotrophic and live in both freshwater and seawater.  They have two flagella and a feeding apparatus consisting of a mouth and two arrays of microtubules (one inside the other).

Etymology
It derives its name from the Greek words κατά (kata) (downwards) and βλεφαρίς (blepharis) (eyelash).

Species 

This is a partial list.

 K. japonica Okamoto & Inouye 2005
 K. obesa Barlow & Kugrens 2002
 K. tenuis Barlow & Kugrens 2002
 K. hyalurus Skuja 1939
 K. notonectoides Skuja 1948
 K. oblonga Skuja 1939
 K. ovalis Skuja 1948
 K. phoenikoston Skuja 1939
 K. remigera (Vørs 1992) Clay & Kugrens 1999 [Leucocryptos remigera Vørs 1992]

References 

Hacrobia genera
Katablepharida